Máel Patraic Ua Scannail or Patrick Ó Scannail (sometimes Patrick O'Scanlan) was an Irish Roman Catholic cleric. He served as Bishop of Raphoe, and later as Archbishop of Armagh and Primate of All Ireland from 1262 to 1272.

In 1268 he laid out designs for the expansion of St. Patrick's Cathedral, Armagh (the structure now used by the Anglican  Church of Ireland). The cathedral survives substantially to his plan.
A magnificent Gothic Revival Cathedral, to designs by Duff revised by McCarthy, St. Patrick's Cathedral, Armagh (Roman Catholic)) was erected on a neighbouring hill to serve the Roman Catholic community the mediaeval cathedral having conformed to the Anglican Rite as a result of the Elizabethan Reformation.

See also

 Ó Scannail

External links
 Coat of Arms

13th-century Roman Catholic bishops in Ireland
Clergy from County Sligo
Medieval Gaels from Ireland
13th-century deaths
People from County Armagh
Burials at St Patrick's Cathedral, Armagh (Church of Ireland)
Archbishops of Armagh
Year of birth unknown